Avgolemono ( or  literally egg–lemon) is a family of sauces and soups made with egg yolk and lemon juice mixed with broth, heated until they thicken. They are found in Greek,  Arab, Sephardic Jewish, Turkish, Balkan and Jewish-Italian cuisine.

In Sephardic Jewish cuisine, it is called agristada or salsa blanco, and in Jewish-Italian, bagna brusca, brodettato, or brodo brusco. In Arabic, it is called tarbiya or beida bi-lemoune 'egg with lemon'; and in Turkish terbiye. It is also widely used in Balkan cuisine.

History
Although often considered a Greek dish, avgolemono is originally Sephardic Jewish: agristada has been described by Claudia Roden as the "cornerstone of Sephardic cooking." 

Agristada was made by Jews in Iberia before the expulsion from Spain with verjuice, pomegranate juice, or bitter orange juice, but not vinegar. In later periods, lemon became the standard acidic ingredient.

Sauce
As a sauce, it is used for warm dolma, for vegetables like artichokes, and roast meats. According to Joyce Goldstein, the dish terbiyeli köfte is made by frying meatballs until they are cooked through, then preparing a pan sauce by deglazing the pan and using the cooking juices to temper the avgolemono, which is served over the meatballs. 

In some Middle Eastern cuisines, it is used as a sauce for chicken or fish. Among Italian Jews, it is served as a sauce for pasta or meat.

Soup
Avgolemono can also be used to thicken soups and stews. Yuvarlakia is a Greek meatball soup made with rice and meat meatballs that are cooked in liquid. Avgolemono is added to the soup to thicken it. Magiritsa soup is a Greek avgolemono soup of lamb offal served to break the fast of Great Lent.

For some Sephardic Jews, this soup (also called sopa de huevo y limón) is a traditional way to break the Yom Kippur fast.

As a soup, avgolemono usually starts with chicken broth, though meat (usually lamb), fish, or vegetable broths are also used. Typically, rice, orzo, pastina, or tapioca are cooked in the broth before the mixture of eggs and lemon is added. Its consistency varies from near-stew to near-broth. It is often served with pieces of the meat and vegetables reserved from the broth. 

The soup is usually made with whole eggs, but sometimes with just yolks. The whites may be beaten into a foam separately before mixing with the yolks and lemon juice, or whole eggs may be beaten with the lemon juice. The starch of the pasta or rice contributes to stabilizing the emulsion.

See also

 List of egg dishes
 List of lemon dishes and beverages
 List of sauces
 List of soups

References

Bibliography
 Alan Davidson, The Oxford Companion to Food, Oxford, 1999. .

Middle Eastern cuisine
Balkan cuisine
Cypriot cuisine
Mizrahi Jewish cuisine
Sephardi Jewish cuisine
Soups
Lemon dishes
Greek sauces
Greek soups
Egg-based sauces
Turkish cuisine
Yom Kippur
Citrus dishes